Xu Juan (born 8 May 1981) is a Chinese retired goalball player. She won a silver medal at the 2008 Summer Paralympics.

Her visual impairment is hereditary. From a rural background, she took part in the Jiangsu Provincial Para Games in 1999, winning bronze medals in discus throw, shot put, and javelin throw. Thereafter, she was invited to try goalball. She also taught massage classes. After retirement, she became the chairperson for the Blind Persons' Association in her home city Jurong, Jiangsu.

References

Female goalball players
1981 births
Living people
Sportspeople from Jiangsu
People from Jurong, Jiangsu
Paralympic goalball players of China
Paralympic silver medalists for China
Goalball players at the 2008 Summer Paralympics
Medalists at the 2008 Summer Paralympics
Paralympic medalists in goalball
People with albinism
21st-century Chinese women